The Division of Hasluck is an electoral division of the Australian House of Representatives, located in Western Australia.

History

The division was proclaimed at a redistribution of Western Australia's electoral divisions on 20 November 2000, and first contested at the 2001 federal election. The eponyms of the division are Sir Paul Hasluck, the member for the Division of Curtin in the House of Representatives from 1949 to 1969 and subsequently the Governor-General of Australia from 1969 to 1974, and his wife, Dame Alexandra Hasluck, an author.

Hasluck is a marginal seat and changed hands between the Labor Party and Liberal Party at the first four elections it was contested. At the 2013 federal election there was a swing towards the incumbent Liberal member Ken Wyatt, breaking this pattern. Wyatt was the first Indigenous Australian member of the House of Representatives.

Geography
Federal electoral division boundaries in Australia are determined at redistributions by a redistribution committee appointed by the Australian Electoral Commission. Redistributions occur for the boundaries of divisions in a particular state, and they occur every seven years, or sooner if a state's representation entitlement changes or when divisions of a state are malapportioned.

From its creation at the 2001 election to the 2013 election, the Division of Hasluck was a north-south arc across Perth's eastern suburbs from Southern River/Gosnells (in the City of Gosnells) in the south to Caversham/Midland (in the City of Swan) in the north. It also incorporated the more urbanised western parts of what was then the Shire of Kalamunda, such as Forrestfield and Kalamunda, and the Shire of Mundaring.

In the redistribution prior to the 2016 election, the Division of Hasluck ceded its portion of the City of Gosnells south of the Canning River to the newly created Division of Burt and the suburb of High Wycombe to the Division of Swan, among other changes. In turn, it gained most of the less urbanised areas of what was then the Shire of Kalamunda, the remainder of the Shire of Mundaring and further territory in the City of Swan from the Division of Pearce. As a result of adding in more rural and semi-rural areas, the area of the Division of Hasluck increased from 245 km2 to 1,192 km2.

In August 2021, the Australian Electoral Commission (AEC) announced a number of changes to the boundaries of Hasluck. The Gosnells suburbs of Beckenham, Kenwick and Maddington, along with the seat's portion of Gosnells, were transferred to the electorate of Canning, thus removing the City of Gosnells from Hasluck entirely. In addition, the Kalamunda suburbs of Maida Vale and Wattle Grove, along with the seat's portion of Forrestfield, were transferred to the electorate of Swan. Hasluck consequently gained a large portion of the City of Swan from the seat of Pearce, including the suburbs of Aveley, Baskerville, Belhus, Brabham, Brigadoon, Dayton, Ellenbrook, Henley Brook, Herne Hill, Millendon, The Vines, Upper Swan, West Swan and Whiteman, a portion of Lexia, and the remainder of Middle Swan and Red Hill, also gaining the suburb of Bennett Springs from the seat of Cowan.  These boundary changes took place as of the 2022 election.

On its current (2022) boundaries, the Division of Hasluck includes the following suburbs:

* Split between Hasluck and Swan.

Members

Electoral results

References

External links
 Division of Hasluck - Australian Electoral Commission
 Hasluck - ABC Australia Votes 2013
 Hasluck - Election Blog

Electoral divisions of Australia
Constituencies established in 2000
2000 establishments in Australia
Federal politics in Western Australia